Barrow is a village and civil parish in the county of Rutland in the East Midlands of England.  It is located about five miles (8 km) north-east of Oakham. At the 2011 census the population remained less than 100 and is included in the civil parish of Cottesmore.

The village's name means 'Burial-mound/hill', probably signifying to the  one on the crest of the hill near The Green.

References

External links

Rutland Website – Barrow

Barrow Stables

www.barrowstables.com

Villages in Rutland
Civil parishes in Rutland